Nohant-en-Graçay is a commune in the Cher department in the Centre-Val de Loire region of France.

Geography
The A20 runs through the commune.

Population

Sights
 The church, dating from the twelfth century.
 The house of Zulma Carraud, writer and friend of Balzac, next to the church.

See also
Communes of the Cher department

References

Communes of Cher (department)